Akanni Hislop (born 1 June 1998) is a Trinidad and Tobago athlete. He competed in the men's 4 × 100 metres relay event at the 2020 Summer Olympics.

References

External links
 

1998 births
Living people
Trinidad and Tobago male sprinters
Athletes (track and field) at the 2020 Summer Olympics
Olympic athletes of Trinidad and Tobago
Place of birth missing (living people)
Athletes (track and field) at the 2014 Summer Youth Olympics
Pan American Games medalists in athletics (track and field)
LSU Tigers track and field athletes
Pan American Games silver medalists for Trinidad and Tobago
Medalists at the 2019 Pan American Games